Clelia Duel Mosher (KLEEL-ya DUE-el MOE-sher; December 16, 1863 – December 21, 1940) was a physician, hygienist and women's health advocate who disapproved of Victorian stereotypes about the physical incapacities of women.

Education

Mosher attended Wellesley College, the University of Wisconsin, and Stanford University, where she received a bachelor's degree in zoology in 1893. In 1894, she received a master's degree from Stanford. In 1896, Mosher became a student at the Johns Hopkins School of Medicine.
Mosher's Master's degree thesis disproved the then widely held belief that women were physically inferior to men because they could only breathe costally, showing instead it was only women’s fashionable corset clothing of the time that prevented diaphragmatic breathing. She found that women would breathe with their diaphragm with enough exercise.

Career

After her graduation as a doctor of medicine, Mosher worked in private practice, until she became an assistant professor of personal hygiene at Stanford in 1910.

Mosher subsequently researched menstruation, gathering data from 2,000 women over 12,000 menstrual cycles. She revealed unhygienic habits that caused painful menstruation and created the Mosher breathing exercise, making her possibly the first American physician to advocate core-body-strength-increasing exercises to reduce the pain of menstrual cramps.

Her most famous work, published posthumously, was a survey that she began in 1892 as an undergraduate when preparing to lecture on the "Marital Relation" before the Mother's Club of the University of Wisconsin, and continued throughout her career. It is the only known existing survey of Victorian women's sexual habits, and was initially controversial because of its frankness and the overwhelmingly sex-positive views of the participants, even including the use of "male sheaths" (now called condoms) and "rubber cap over the uterus" (either a diaphragm or cervical cap) birth control. All this stood in high contrast to other existing historical literature of the time which held that women have no sexual desires and sex should only be used for reproduction. One theory is because the researcher was a woman gathering data from women that knew the results would only be put forth before a purely female audience, the normal strictures of propriety of that time were let down and more realistic data was actually gathered.

See also
Birth control movement in the United States

Notes

Bibliography

Published
Normal Menstruation and Some of the Factors Modifying It (Johns Hopkins Hospital Bulletin)
The Relation of Health to the Woman Movement (1915)
Woman’s Physical Freedom (1923)

References

Printed

Web

External links

1863 births
1940 deaths
Hygienists
American primary care physicians
American women physicians
Physicians from Albany, New York
American feminists
Stanford University alumni
Stanford University School of Medicine faculty
Johns Hopkins University alumni
American Red Cross personnel
American sexologists